Paimpont (Gallo: Penpont) is a commune in the Ille-et-Vilaine department in Brittany in northwestern France.

The name is a compound of Old Breton pen "head" and the Latin borrowing pont "bridge" and is first attested in the 9th century in the Latinised form Caput Pontis and then in 870 CE as Penpont.

Population
Inhabitants of Paimpont are called Paimpontais in French.

See also
 Paimpont forest
Communes of the Ille-et-Vilaine department

References

External links

 Official website Paimpont 
 Cultural Heritage 
 www.paimpont.org 

Communes of Ille-et-Vilaine